Ancylosis velessa is a species of snout moth in the genus Ancylosis. It was described by Harrison Gray Dyar Jr. in 1914. It is found in Panama.

References

Moths described in 1914
velessa
Moths of Central America